Demchenko is a gender-neutral Ukrainian surname. It may refer to:
 Albert Demchenko (born 1971), Russian luger
 Andriy Demchenko (born 1976), Ukrainian and Russian footballer
 Anton Demchenko (born 1987), Russian chess grandmaster
 Ivan Demchenko (born 1960), Russian politician
 Nikolai Demchenko (1896–1937), Soviet politician
 Nikita Demchenko (born 2002), Belarusian footballer
 Oleksandr Demchenko (born 1996), Ukrainian footballer
 Ruslan Demchenko (born 1965), Ukrainian diplomat
 Sergey Demchenko (born 1974), Belarusian wrestler
 Serhiy Demchenko (born 1979), Ukrainian boxer
 Svitlana Demchenko (born 2003), Canadian chess player
 Vasily Demchenko (born 1994), Russian ice hockey player
 Victoria Demchenko (born 1995), Russian luger
 Volodymyr Demchenko (born 1981), Ukrainian sprinter
 Yehor Demchenko (born 1997), Ukrainian footballer

See also
 

Ukrainian-language surnames